The Northwest Papuan languages are a proposed language family of Papuan languages.

Many of the constituent branches of Northwest Papuan were first proposed to be related by H.K.J. Cowan in the 1950s. Voorhoeve (1971) connected the Border and Tor families. Using only pronouns as a diagnostic, Malcolm Ross linked most of the western (Foja Range) branch of the family, which is now fairly secure. The current form of the proposal was worked out by Timothy Usher under the name "North(west) New Guinea" (not to be confused with the proposed North New Guinea branch of the Austronesian language family).
It is not yet certain, however, that the similarities in vocabulary between Foja Range and the other constituent families are due to inheritance rather than borrowing.

Languages
Fas
Sentani
Border (Upper Tami)
Sko
Foja Range
Nimboran
Kwerbic
Mawes
Orya–Tor

The western branch, Foja Range, is equivalent to Ross's Tor–Kwerba family with the addition of Nimboran.

Søren Wichmann (2013) considers Nimboran, Kapauri (under Kwerbic above), Border, and possibly also Elseng (under Border above) to form a unified language family.

Lexical comparison
The lexical data below is from the Trans-New Guinea database and Usher (2020), unless noted otherwise.

References

 
Languages of Papua New Guinea
Languages of western New Guinea
Proposed language families
Papuan languages